The Canoo Multi-Purpose Delivery Vehicle (MPDV for short) is a line of battery electric delivery vans produced by Canoo, the first of which was unveiled in December 2020. There are three planned models, the MPDV1 and the taller MPDV2, both sharing the same wheelbase and platform as the earlier Canoo Lifestyle Vehicle, and the MPDV3, which will use an enlarged version of the same platform.

History
Canoo announced it had developed the Multi-Purpose Delivery Vehicle in December 2020; although ostensibly designed as a work van to haul cargo, Canoo also touted the potential customization possibilities of the slab-sided vehicle. The price is expected to be comparable with conventional work vans powered by internal combustion engines.

Preorders opened in January 2021. Prior to the MPDV, Canoo first had announced the similarly-sized Canoo Lifestyle Vehicle for passengers in 2019, using the same Canoo Multi-Purpose Platform. The Lifestyle Delivery Vehicle (LDV) is a cargo-specific variant of the Lifestyle Vehicle intended for fleet operation, and the LDV received several notable orders in 2022, including 4,500 for retailer Walmart and 3,000 for fleet management company Zeeba. Walmart began testing LDV prototypes in the Dallas-Fort Worth area starting in summer 2022.

Limited quantities of the MPDV were scheduled to start becoming available in 2022; an initial production target of 1,000 Canoo vehicles was to be filled by contract manufacturer VDL Nedcar while Canoo was completing its "Mega Micro" factory in Pryor, Oklahoma, but Canoo later announced that early low-volume production will occur at its Bentonville, Arkansas headquarters / research & development facility instead.

Design
Compared to the rounded Lifestyle Vehicle (LV) which was the first vehicle announced by Canoo, the MPDV has an angular, faceted style that Dwell has likened to the Tesla Cybertruck. It was designed by Richard Kim, who previously had designed the LV.

Platform
The Canoo Multi-Purpose Platform that underpins all its vehicles is a skateboard chassis that carries battery modules within the perimeter frame, protected on bottom and top by a belly panel and the vehicle cabin floor; the modules form part of the frame's structure, helping to stiffen it and lowering overall weight by approximately 15% compared to peer designs.

Powertrain

The battery modules are composed of cylindrical 2170 battery cells and have the potential to use 4680 battery or pouch cells. With 2170 cells, the energy density is 195 W-hr/kg. The traction battery operates at a nominal 400 V.

Notes

Cargo

References

External links
 
 

Cars introduced in 2020
Electric vans